Ronald Alexis Gamboa Johnson (born 18 June 1981) is a Chilean former footballer who played as an attacking midfielder for clubs in Chile and abroad.

Club career
A product of Colo-Colo youth system, Gamboa left the club at the end of 2001 season and switched to Magallanes, staying with them until 2004. At the end of 2004, he moved abroad and joined Mexican side Lobos BUAP, where he coincided with his compatriot Mario Cáceres. In 2006 he played for Ecuadorian side ESPOLI.

Back in Chile, he joined Unión Española for the 2007 season. The next year, he moved abroad again and tried to sign with Östers IF as wells as Degerfors IF in Sweden, but he finally played in the Australian soccer.

References

External links
 
 

1981 births
Living people
People from La Serena
Chilean footballers
Chilean expatriate footballers
Colo-Colo footballers
Deportes Magallanes footballers
Magallanes footballers
Lobos BUAP footballers
C.D. ESPOLI footballers
Unión Española footballers
Chilean Primera División players
Primera B de Chile players
Ascenso MX players
Ecuadorian Serie B players
Chilean expatriate sportspeople in Mexico
Chilean expatriate sportspeople in Ecuador
Chilean expatriate sportspeople in Australia
Expatriate footballers in Mexico
Expatriate footballers in Ecuador
Expatriate soccer players in Australia
Association football midfielders